Sharon Everitt is an American film and television director, producer, and editor.

Career 
Everitt's resume primarily consists of directing comedy, music, and performance.  She is known for directing the Comedy Central series The High Court starring Doug Benson, featuring guest stars Tiffany Haddish, Michael Ian Black, and Reggie Watts, among others.  In 2018, Everitt directed the short film Brentwood starring Brent Spiner and Peri Gilpin which has played at the Mill Valley Film Festival.

Everitt is also known as the Executive Producer of the Disney Christmas specials on ABC from 2011 to 2013.

Everitt also has an extensive editorial history which primarily consists of editing comedy and music, including multiple official music videos for artist Taylor Swift.

In December 2018, NBC announced Everitt was announced as one of the members of the NBC Alternative Directors Program in its inaugural year.  She will work on  World of Dance and The Wall.

In 2019, Everitt's film Brentwood was named "Best Short Film" by the Independent Film Showcase in Los Angeles.

In 2019, Everitt's science fiction film Polybius premiered at Fantastic Fest in Austin, Texas. 

Everitt directed the pilot episode of One Perfect Shot with executive producer Ava DuVernay for HBO Max in 2022.  

Everitt directed the first season of That's My Time with David Letterman for Netflix during the 2022 Netflix Is a Joke festival in Los Angeles.

Filmography

Television

Film

Music videos

Advertising 
Everitt has directed spots for brands including Disney Parks and the LA County Fair.

Awards and nominations 

|-
| 2013
| Disney Parks Christmas Day Parade
| EMMY Outstanding Multiple Camera Editing
| 
|-
| 2014
| Disney Parks Christmas Day Parade
| EMMY Outstanding Special Class Special
| 
|-
| 2014
| Disney Parks Christmas Day Parade
| EMMY Outstanding Multiple Camera Editing
|

References

External links 

 
 

Year of birth missing (living people)
Living people
Place of birth missing (living people)
Butler University alumni
American television directors
American women television directors
American television editors
Women television editors